Jean Flori (7 April 1936 – 18 April 2018) was a French medieval historian. He was a research director for the National Center for Scientific Research, and the author of books about chivalry and the Crusades. A student of Georges Duby, he is one of the twentieth century's "major historian[s] of chivalry".

References

1936 births
2018 deaths
French medievalists
20th-century French historians
21st-century French historians
People from Lillebonne